Antoine Jean-Baptiste (born 20 January 1991 in Longjumeau, France) is a professional footballer who plays as a defender for FC Vaulx-en-Velin in the French Championnat National 3 and internationally for Martinique.

Career
He made his debut for Martinique in 2014. He was in the Martinique Gold Cup squads for the 2017  tournaments.

References

External links

1991 births
Living people
Martiniquais footballers
French footballers
Martinique international footballers
Association football defenders
People from Longjumeau
Footballers from Essonne
2017 CONCACAF Gold Cup players
FC Aurillac Arpajon Cantal Auvergne players
Luçon FC players
GOAL FC players
FC Villefranche Beaujolais players
Championnat National players
Championnat National 2 players
Championnat National 3 players
FC Vaulx-en-Velin players